Neoclassical pixi is a species of beetle in the family Cerambycidae. It was first described by Mitchell Anderson and Michael Newman in 1952.

References

Acanthocinini
Beetles described in 1952